David Walsh (born 1966) is an Irish Gaelic footballer who played as a right corner-back for the Tipperary senior team.

Born in Tipperary, Walsh first arrived on the inter-county scene at the age of sixteen when he first linked up with the Tipperary minor team before later joining the under-21 side. Walsh joined the senior panel during the 1987 championship.

At club level Walsh is a one-time championship medallist with Arravale Rovers.

He retired from inter-county football following the conclusion of the 1987 championship.

Honours

Player

Arravale Rovers
Tipperary Senior Football Championship (1): 1985

Tipperary
Munster Minor Football Championship (1): 1984

References

1966 births
Living people
Arravale Rovers Gaelic footballers
Tipperary inter-county Gaelic footballers